Estonia competed at the 1936 Summer Olympics in Berlin, Germany. It was the last time that Estonia competed at the Summer Games as an independent nation until the 1992 Summer Olympics. After the nation was occupied by the Soviet Union in 1940, a number of Estonian athletes competed as part of the USSR delegations at the Summer Olympic games from 1952 to 1988.

Medals

The 1936 Estonian Olympic Team
Estonia sent 37 athletes and 13 representatives to those games. 
 Representatives 
Estonian National Olympic Committee representative was Konrad Mauritz. Estonian team representatives were delegation heads: NOC secretary Ado Anderkopp and Harald Tammer, attaché Councillor at the Legation Georg Meri, Officer of the Honorary Service Lieutenant Refior, manager Johannes Villemson, Aleksander Paluvere in athletics, Nikolai Kursman in wrestling, Eduard Kõppo in weightlifting, Peeter Matsov in boxing, Gustav Laanekõrb in sailing, Richard Mast in swimming, Edgar Kolmpere in basketball, Aleksander Praks – massage therapist, Valentin Purre – team chef, dr. Arnold Roomere-Rõmmer – medical doctor.
There were also 30 Estonian youths, led by Johan Meimer, taking part of The International Youth Encampment and 28 students took part of The International Physical Education Students’ Encampment in Berlin.
 Team coaches 
Aleksander Kolmpere – athletics, Nikolai Kursman – wrestling, Herbert Niiler – basketball.
 Judges 
Aleksei Selenoi in basketball, Peeter Matsov in boxing; Johannes Kauba, Karl Kullisaar and Johannes Villemson in wrestling
 Other delegations

Press
Aleksander Antson (Eesti Spordipressi Klubi and Uusi Suomi), Oskar Lõvi alias Toomas Kivi (Postimees, Päevaleht and Eesti Raadio), Aadu Adari-Adorf (Uudisleht), Vladimir Raudsepp (Uus Eesti), Ilmar Peterson  (Päevaleht), Aksel Vaik (Vaba Maa), Harald Nõmmik (Rahvaleht). Newspaper columnists Artur Reisner, Eevald Äärma, Johannes Villemson, Ernst Idla etc. The International Youth Encampment coverage by R. Uustal and The International Physical Education Students’ Encampment coverage by Arved Ojari.

Olympic Identity Cards
The Organizing Committee issued 126 Olympic Identity Cards for Estonian participants.

Athletics

Men
Track & road events

Field events

Basketball

Men
 Estonian Team: (Artur Amon, Aleksander Illi, Robert Keres, Vladimir Kärk, Evald Mahl, Heino Veskila, Erich Altosaar, Aleksander Margiste, Bernhard Nooni, Leonid Saar, Georg Vinogradov, Coach: Herbert Niiler)

First round
Winners advanced to the second round.  Losers competed in the first consolation round for another chance to move on.

Second round
Winners advanced to the third round. Losers competed in the second consolation round for another chance to move on.

Third round
Winners advanced to the third round. Losers competed in the second consolation round for another chance to move on.

Boxing

Men

Rowing

Estonia had one rowers participate in one out of seven rowing events in 1936.

Men

Sailing

Open

 Harald Tammik – reserve, Boat name: Brandenburg No. O/G 304

Swimming

Men

Weightlifting

Men

Wrestling

Men's Freestyle

Men's Greco-Roman

References

Official Olympic Reports
International Olympic Committee results database
Estonian Olympic Committee –  about the Berlin 1936 Olympics 
 
 

Nations at the 1936 Summer Olympics
1936
1936 in Estonian sport